Wellington Tavares Fajardo (born 11 June 1961) is a Brazilian retired football manager and former player who played as a goalkeeper.

Honours

Player
Cruzeiro
Campeonato Mineiro: 1987

Manager
Tupi
Campeonato Mineiro Módulo II: 2001
Taça Minas Gerais: 2008

Manaus
Campeonato Amazonense: 2019

References

External links

1961 births
Living people
Sportspeople from Minas Gerais
Brazilian footballers
Association football goalkeepers
Campeonato Brasileiro Série A players
América Futebol Clube (MG) players
Cruzeiro Esporte Clube players
Vila Nova Futebol Clube players
São José Esporte Clube players
América Futebol Clube (SP) players
Brazilian football managers
Campeonato Brasileiro Série D managers
Tupi Football Club managers
Associação Atlética Francana managers
Sobradinho Esporte Clube managers
Uberlândia Esporte Clube managers
Esporte Clube Democrata managers
Villa Nova Atlético Clube managers
Manaus Futebol Clube managers
União Recreativa dos Trabalhadores managers
Treze Futebol Clube managers